BAP or bap may refer to:

Food
 Bap (bread), a type of bread roll
 Bap (rice dish), a Korean food

Music
 BAP (Basque band), a hardcore punk group (formed 1984)
 BAP (German band), a Colognian rock group (formed 1976)
 B.A.P (South Korean band) (2012–2019)
 Bap Kennedy (1962–2016), Northern Irish singer-songwriter
 Build a Problem, 2021 indie album by Dodie

Organizations

Political parties
 Balochistan Awami Party, Pakistan
 Bright Armenia, Armenia

Railway companies
 Buenos Aires al Pacífico S.A., Argentina (1993–2000)
 Buenos Aires and Pacific Railway (BA&P), Argentina (1886–1948)
 Butte, Anaconda and Pacific Railway, Montana, US (founded 1891)

Other organizations
 Basketball Association of the Philippines, defunct sports body (1938–2007)
 Beta Alpha Psi, an international honor society
 Bankruptcy Appellate Panel, form of American judicial body

Places
 Bap, Rajasthan, a panchayat village in Jodhpur District, Rajasthan, India
 Bap tehsil, its enclosing township

Science and technology
 6-Benzylaminopurine, a plant hormone
 Backhaul Adaptation Protocol, a network protocol used in 5G
 Best Aquaculture Practices (BAP)
 Biodiversity action plan
 Blood agar plate

Other uses
 BAP System, a point system for chess 
 Bali Action Plan
 Black American princess
 Bronze Age Pervert, pseudonymous neoreactionary writer
 Browning Automatic Pistol is another name used to describe the Browning Hi-Power pistol
 BAP (Buque Armada Peruana), the prefix for ships of the Peruvian Navy

See also 
 Baps (disambiguation)